Koeye River (pronounced Kway) is a river in the Canadian province of British Columbia.

The Koeye River is located on the Central Coast of British Columbia, in the Great Bear Rainforest. It empties into Fitz Hugh Sound, part of the Inside Passage. The river is within the traditional territory of the Heiltsuk, Wuikinuxv, and Nuxalk, today the Heiltsuk Nation, Wuikinuxv Nation, and Nuxalk Nation.

The Koeye River's name comes from a Heiltsuk word, possibly meaning "sitting on the water", the ̓Wuikinuxv called it Kvii and the Heiltsuk K̓vaí.

Course
The Koeye River originates in the Pacific Ranges of the Coast Mountains, between Rivers Inlet and Burke Channel. It flows generally west through Koeye Lake and Little Koeye Lake, then north of the Koeye Range to empty into Fitz Hugh Sound at Koeye Point.

Natural history
The Koeye River supports Chinook, Chum, Coho, Pink, and Sockeye salmon, as well as Steelhead and Cutthroat trout. Terrestrial wildlife of the Koeye watershed includes grizzly bear, American black bear, wolf, deer, cougar, mountain goat, wolverine, and North American river otter. The river's estuary is used by many waterfowl, including rare and endangered species such as the western grebe, trumpeter swan, and marbled murrelet.

Protection
The Koeye River's watershed land is protected by the Koeye Conservancy, which is co-managed by the Wuikinuxv Nation and the Province of British Columbia.

The river's estuary, along with the nearby Namu River at Namu, is one of the largest complexes of ancient forests of British Columbia's Central Coast. The area is listed as a Protected Area under the Great Bear Rainforest agreement.

See also
 List of British Columbia rivers

References

External links
 Habitat Mapping in the Koeye River Estuary, Hakai Institute
 Study area and major spawning areas in the Koeye River, ResearchGate
 Map of Conservancies in Wuikinuxv Territory, Coastal First Nations, Great Bear Initiative

Rivers of British Columbia
Rivers of the Pacific Ranges
Rivers of the Central Coast of British Columbia
Range 2 Coast Land District